Ethan Byron Moreau (born September 22, 1975) is a Canadian former professional ice hockey player. Moreau  was selected in the first round of the 1994 NHL Entry Draft, 14th overall, by the Chicago Blackhawks of the National Hockey League (NHL). He also played with the Edmonton Oilers, Columbus Blue Jackets and the Los Angeles Kings of the NHL. He recently served as an assistant coach for Niagara University. Currently, Moreau is the Director of Hockey at Athol Murray College of Notre Dame in Wilcox, Saskatchewan.

Playing career

Minor
Moreau played his minor hockey with the Huntsville Blues of the OMHA, before playing Jr.B. hockey for the Orillia Terriers in the 1990—91 season.

Junior
Pre-OHL, Moreau played OHA-B junior hockey in Orillia, Ontario, for the Orillia Terriers, where he won the coveted Steve Philips Memorial Award for Most Improved Player (1990—91 season).  When Moreau was selected by the Blackhawks, he had just completed his third year in the OHL, playing for Niagara Falls. In addition to good physical presence and skating, Moreau had shown a remarkable scoring touch in his draft year. The Blackhawks allowed Moreau to play another year in junior (for Sudbury), before bringing him to their IHL team in Indianapolis.  Moreau also saw spot duty in the NHL, playing 8 games.

NHL
The following season (1996–97) was Moreau's first full year in the NHL, and he went on to play parts of four seasons with Chicago.

On March 20, 1999, Moreau was dealt in a blockbuster trade to the Edmonton Oilers along with Chad Kilger, Daniel Cleary and Christian Laflamme in exchange for Boris Mironov, Dean McAmmond and Jonas Elofsson.

In 2003-04, he scored a career-high 20 goals and was one of the team's best players in a failed late run for the playoffs.  The following NHL season was cancelled due to the lockout, so Moreau played with EC VSV Villach of the Austrian Hockey League.

Moreau was part of the Edmonton Oilers team that made a run to the Stanley Cup Finals in 2006, in which the Oilers lost in game 7 of the finals to the Carolina Hurricanes. Moreau had 2 goals and 1 assist in the playoffs.

On October 6, 2006, Moreau was signed by the Oilers to a 4-year contract extension, staving off the unrestricted free agency and keeping the winger with the team through the 2010–2011 season.

On October 2, 2007, Moreau was named captain of the Oilers, replacing the recently departed Jason Smith. However, he fractured his tibia a day later, (blocking a shot by Adrian Aucoin) during an exhibition game, which would result in missing 38 games.  He returned during the mid-season, only to be injured again with a broken left leg, on February 25.  Moreau had struggled with injuries during the 2006–07 and 2007–08 seasons and managed to play only 32 games, between these two seasons.

Moreau was also the last remaining asset that the Oilers retained, as a result of the Wayne Gretzky trade — taking all subsequent trades into account.
He was also one of the longest-serving Oiler players in recent history, having been a member of the team from March 20, 1999, until June 30, 2010.

On January 18, 2009, Moreau scored his first career hat-trick in a 6-3 victory over the Phoenix Coyotes.

During a game against the Minnesota Wild, in Edmonton, on February 28, 2009, Moreau suffered an eye injury. Antti Miettinen of the Wild caught Moreau with a high stick, sending him sprawling to the ice. Doctors at the Royal Alexandra Hospital in Edmonton concluded that he suffered a scratched cornea and bleeding behind the eye.

On June 18, 2009, Ethan Moreau was awarded the King Clancy Memorial Trophy for best exemplifying leadership qualities on and off the ice and by also making significant humanitarian contributions to the Oilers Community Foundation.

On June 30, 2010, Moreau was claimed off waivers by the Columbus Blue Jackets. The Oilers were intending to buy out the final year of his contract had he gone unclaimed.

On August 20, 2011, he signed a one-year contract with the Los Angeles Kings for $600,000.

Retirement
On June 20, 2012, following the Kings' Stanley Cup Championship, Moreau joined the Montreal Canadiens' scouting staff as professional scout for the Western Conference.

Career statistics

Coaching
In 2016, he joined as the Niagara Purple Eagles men's ice hockey team as assistant coach of Dave Burkholder.

References

External links

1975 births
Canadian ice hockey left wingers
Chicago Blackhawks draft picks
Chicago Blackhawks players
Columbus Blue Jackets players
EC VSV players
Edmonton Oilers players
Ice hockey people from Ontario
King Clancy Memorial Trophy winners
Living people
Los Angeles Kings players
Montreal Canadiens scouts
National Hockey League first-round draft picks
Niagara Falls Thunder players
People from Huntsville, Ontario
Sudbury Wolves players
Niagara Purple Eagles men's ice hockey
Canadian expatriate ice hockey players in Austria